Homewood Mountain Resort is a ski area located on the west shore of Lake Tahoe in the state of California, a few miles south of Tahoe City in the town of Homewood. It has  of skiable terrain and eight lifts. While it currently does not offer lodging on site, a Draft Environmental Impact Statement has been submitted to the regional planning commission to allow for the development of a resort inclusive of a hotel, condominiums, and various other additions. Since 2006, JMA Ventures, a San Francisco Bay Area developer, has owned and operated the ski area.

Management
In 2006, Jeff Yurosek sold Homewood to JMA Ventures, a Bay Area development company.  Yurosek, who had owned the ski area since 1998, originally wanted to sell the land to the U.S. Forest Service.  JMA Ventures says it "is in the planning stages for a redevelopment of the resort including both the north and south base areas." The project is in the environmental review process. JMA Ventures also acquired Alpine Meadows, which physically merged with Squaw Valley as part of a joint venture in 2011.

Resort 
Homewood offers trails ranging from beginner to expert. The resort is usually open from December to April and receives about 300 sunny days. The resort is located on the west shore of Lake Tahoe, and most of the mountain faces east, shielding the snow from buffeting winds. The resort is known to have great views of the lake and excellent powder, once winning a top 10 award in the Ski Magazine.

In the summer, Homewood is open to the public, boasting mountain biking and hiking trails all over the mountain. Although the lifts are not operational in the summer, the North Lodge and a cafe are open.

Climate
Homewood Mountain Resort, on average, experiences  of snow precipitation and has about 300 days of sunny weather a year. Ellis Peak shields the resort from the high winds created by storms coming over the Sierra Crest creating great snow conditions while other resorts are experiencing "wind holds."

References

External links
 Homewood Mountain Resort

Geography of Placer County, California
Ski areas and resorts in California
Tourist attractions in Placer County, California